Daniel Calveti (born November 29, 1977) is a Venezuelan Christian music singer. He was born in Caracas and eventually moved his family to Caguas, Puerto Rico. Calveti has seven productions of Christian music and two books. On three occasions it has been nominated for the Latin Grammy Awards as Best Christian Album in 2006, 2007, 2013 and 2018. He has won five AMCL prizes and three arpa awards.

His album "En Paz", managed to position itself on Billboard charts, debuting at position 9 on the Latin Pop Albums chart.

Biography 
Daniel Calveti is a contemporary Christian music (CCM) artist from Puerto Rico who is among the most popular Latin singers in the genre. Born in Caracas, Venezuela, on November 29, 1977, he moved with his family to Houston at age 12. He later moved to Puerto Rico at age 17 and attended a Christian college. In addition to his deep involvement in ministry, Calveti established himself as a music artist, not only as a live performer but also as a recording artist.

He made his recording debut with Solo Tu Gracia in 2004. His second album, Vivo Para Ti, was a success, garnering nominations in 2006 for a Latin Grammy in the category of Christian Latin Album of the Year and Arpa Awards in the category of Composer of the Year. His third album, Un Día Más, was also nominated for a Latin Grammy and Arpa Awards, along with a Dove Award in 2007. En Paz, his fourth album, his growing success continued. Released by Universal Latino, their first major label release after years of association with independent label CanZion, En Paz was Calveti's most successful commercial release to date; the title track was his first hit single to chart on the Billboard Latin Pop Airplay chart.

In 2012, Calveti presented his album Mi Refugio, which included the collaborations of the singers Christine D’Clario and Funky on the song «Cada día», as well as David Scarpeta, Giosué Calveti, Jacobo Ramos and Emmanuel Espinosa on the song "Integridad". This album was recognized as Best Songwriter Album at the Arpa Awards.

Discography

Studio albums
 2003: Solo tu gracia
 2005: Vivo para Ti
 2006: Un día más
 2008: En paz
 2009: Mi mundo necesita de Ti
 2012: Mi refugio
 2017: Habla Sobre Mí

Awards and nominations

Latin Grammy Awards 
Nomination as Best Christian Album in 2006, 2007, 2013 and 2018.

AMCL awards 
 2005: Solo tu gracia - Revelation of the year song
 2007: La niña de tus ojos - Song of the people of the year
 2007: Un día más - Traditional or popular album of the year
 2011: Una muestra de amor - Tour of the year
 2012: Mi refugio - Album of the singer of the year

Arpa Awards 
 2009: En paz - Composer of the year
 2009: En paz - Best album of the year
 2013: Mi refugio - Best album of the year

References

External links
 

1977 births
Living people
20th-century Venezuelan male singers
Venezuelan Christians
Singers from Caracas
People from Caguas, Puerto Rico
21st-century  Venezuelan male singers